Petalesharo (YTB-832) is a United States Navy . Petalesharo is named for Pawnee Chief Petalesharo.

Construction

The contract for Petalesharo was awarded 5 June 1973. She was laid down on 26 December 1973 at Marinette, Wisconsin, by Marinette Marine and launched 3 October 1974.

Operational history

Petalesharo was initially assigned to Naval Station Mayport, Florida.  She was overhauled at the Naval Submarine Base Kings Bay Trident Refit Facility in Kings Bay, Georgia, in 1997 and then transferred to the Naval Support Activity, La Maddalena, Italy.  Placed in inactive reserve at SUBRON22, July 1999. Stricken from the Navy List 20 July 2007, ex-Petalesharo was transferred to the Hellenic Navy 10 January 2008.

References

External links
 

 

Natick-class large harbor tugs
Ships built by Marinette Marine
1974 ships